Dundalk Lower is a barony in County Louth, Republic of Ireland.

Etymology
Dundalk Lower is named after the town of Dundalk (Irish: Dún Dealgan, "Dalgan's dún").

Location

Dundalk Lower is found in northeast County Louth, making up all of the Cooley Peninsula.

Dundalk Lower is bordered to the west by Dundalk Upper, and to the northwest by Orior Upper, County Armagh, and to the northeast by Iveagh Upper, Upper Half, and Mourne (Old Irish: Mughdorna) County Down.

History
Dundalk Lower was formed from the territory of Fera Lorg, Lorgan, or Lurgin. In Airgíalla, the MacScannlain are found centered here in the parish of Ballymacscanlan. The barony of Dundalk was the ancient home of the Conaille Muirtheimhne. The barony was split in half by 1821.

Civil Parishes 
There are 4 civil parishes.

 Ballyboys (1 townlands)
 Ballymascanlan (33 townlands)
 Carlingford (49 townlands)
 Jonesborough (5 townlands)

Townlands 
There are 91 townlands.

 Aghaboys, Ballymascanlan Civil Parish, Barony of Lower Dundalk, Co. Louth
 Aghameen, Ballymascanlan Civil Parish, Barony of Lower Dundalk, Co. Louth
 Aghnaskeagh, Ballymascanlan Civil Parish, Barony of Lower Dundalk, Co. Louth
 Anaverna, Ballymascanlan Civil Parish, Barony of Lower Dundalk, Co. Louth
 Annaloughan, Ballymascanlan Civil Parish, Barony of Lower Dundalk, Co. Louth
 Annies, Ballymascanlan Civil Parish, Barony of Lower Dundalk, Co. Louth
 Ardaghy, Carlingford Civil Parish, Barony of Lower Dundalk, Co. Louth
 Ardtully Beg, Carlingford Civil Parish, Barony of Lower Dundalk, Co. Louth
 Ardtully More, Carlingford Civil Parish, Barony of Lower Dundalk, Co. Louth
 Ballagan, Carlingford Civil Parish, Barony of Lower Dundalk, Co. Louth
 Ballaverty, Carlingford Civil Parish, Barony of Lower Dundalk, Co. Louth
 Ballinteskin, Carlingford Civil Parish, Barony of Lower Dundalk, Co. Louth
 Ballug, Carlingford Civil Parish, Barony of Lower Dundalk, Co. Louth
 Ballygoly, Ballymascanlan Civil Parish, Barony of Lower Dundalk, Co. Louth
 Ballymakellett, Ballymascanlan Civil Parish, Barony of Lower Dundalk, Co. Louth
 Ballymascanlan, Ballymascanlan Civil Parish, Barony of Lower Dundalk, Co. Louth
 Ballynamaghery, Carlingford Civil Parish, Barony of Lower Dundalk, Co. Louth
 Ballynamony (Bradshaw), Carlingford Civil Parish, Barony of Lower Dundalk, Co. Louth
 Ballynamony (Murphy), Carlingford Civil Parish, Barony of Lower Dundalk, Co. Louth
 Ballyonan, Carlingford Civil Parish, Barony of Lower Dundalk, Co. Louth
 Ballytrasna, Carlingford Civil Parish, Barony of Lower Dundalk, Co. Louth
 Bavan, Carlingford Civil Parish, Barony of Lower Dundalk, Co. Louth
 Bellurgan, Ballyboys Civil Parish, Barony of Lower Dundalk, Co. Louth
 Benagh, Carlingford Civil Parish, Barony of Lower Dundalk, Co. Louth
 Broughattin, Ballymascanlan Civil Parish, Barony of Lower Dundalk, Co. Louth
 Carrickaneena, Ballymascanlan Civil Parish, Barony of Lower Dundalk, Co. Louth
 Carrickcarnan, Jonesborough Civil Parish, Barony of Lower Dundalk, Co. Louth
 Castlecarragh, Carlingford Civil Parish, Barony of Lower Dundalk, Co. Louth
 Castletowncooley, Carlingford Civil Parish, Barony of Lower Dundalk, Co. Louth
 Commons, Carlingford Civil Parish, Barony of Lower Dundalk, Co. Louth
 Cornamucklagh, Carlingford Civil Parish, Barony of Lower Dundalk, Co. Louth
 Corrakit, Carlingford Civil Parish, Barony of Lower Dundalk, Co. Louth
 Culfore, Ballymascanlan Civil Parish, Barony of Lower Dundalk, Co. Louth
 Doolargy, Ballymascanlan Civil Parish, Barony of Lower Dundalk, Co. Louth
 Drumad, Jonesborough Civil Parish, Barony of Lower Dundalk, Co. Louth
 Drummullagh, Carlingford Civil Parish, Barony of Lower Dundalk, Co. Louth
 Drumnacarra, Ballymascanlan Civil Parish, Barony of Lower Dundalk, Co. Louth
 Drumnasillagh, Ballymascanlan Civil Parish, Barony of Lower Dundalk, Co. Louth
 Earls Quarter, Carlingford Civil Parish, Barony of Lower Dundalk, Co. Louth
 Edentober, Jonesborough Civil Parish, Barony of Lower Dundalk, Co. Louth
 Faughart Lower, Ballymascanlan Civil Parish, Barony of Lower Dundalk, Co. Louth
 Faughart Upper, Ballymascanlan Civil Parish, Barony of Lower Dundalk, Co. Louth
 Feede, Jonesborough Civil Parish, Barony of Lower Dundalk, Co. Louth
 Galtrimsland, Carlingford Civil Parish, Barony of Lower Dundalk, Co. Louth
 Glenmore, Carlingford Civil Parish, Barony of Lower Dundalk, Co. Louth
 Grange Irish, Carlingford Civil Parish, Barony of Lower Dundalk, Co. Louth
 Grange Old, Carlingford Civil Parish, Barony of Lower Dundalk, Co. Louth
 Greenore, Carlingford Civil Parish, Barony of Lower Dundalk, Co. Louth
 Jenkinstown, Ballymascanlan Civil Parish, Barony of Lower Dundalk, Co. Louth
 Killin, Ballymascanlan Civil Parish, Barony of Lower Dundalk, Co. Louth
 Knocknagoran, Carlingford Civil Parish, Barony of Lower Dundalk, Co. Louth
 Liberties of Carlingford, Carlingford Civil Parish, Barony of Lower Dundalk, Co. Louth
 Lislea, Carlingford Civil Parish, Barony of Lower Dundalk, Co. Louth
 Loughanmore, Ballymascanlan Civil Parish, Barony of Lower Dundalk, Co. Louth
 Lower Faughart, Ballymascanlan Civil Parish, Barony of Lower Dundalk, Co. Louth)
 Lower Rath, Carlingford Civil Parish, Barony of Lower Dundalk, Co. Louth)
 Lugbriscan, Carlingford Civil Parish, Barony of Lower Dundalk, Co. Louth
 Maddoxgarden, Carlingford Civil Parish, Barony of Lower Dundalk, Co. Louth
 Maddoxland, Carlingford Civil Parish, Barony of Lower Dundalk, Co. Louth
 Millgrange, Carlingford Civil Parish, Barony of Lower Dundalk, Co. Louth
 Monascreebe, Ballymascanlan Civil Parish, Barony of Lower Dundalk, Co. Louth
 Moneycrockroe, Ballymascanlan Civil Parish, Barony of Lower Dundalk, Co. Louth
 Monksland, Carlingford Civil Parish, Barony of Lower Dundalk, Co. Louth
 Mountbagnall, Carlingford Civil Parish, Barony of Lower Dundalk, Co. Louth
 Muchgrange, Carlingford Civil Parish, Barony of Lower Dundalk, Co. Louth
 Mucklagh, Carlingford Civil Parish, Barony of Lower Dundalk, Co. Louth
 Mullabane, Carlingford Civil Parish, Barony of Lower Dundalk, Co. Louth
 Mullaghattin, Carlingford Civil Parish, Barony of Lower Dundalk, Co. Louth
 Mullaghattin (E.D. Jenkinstown), Ballymascanlan Civil Parish, Barony of Lower Dundalk, Co. Louth
 Mullatee, Carlingford Civil Parish, Barony of Lower Dundalk, Co. Louth
 Navan, Ballymascanlan Civil Parish, Barony of Lower Dundalk, Co. Louth
 Petestown, Carlingford Civil Parish, Barony of Lower Dundalk, Co. Louth
 Piedmont, Ballymascanlan Civil Parish, Barony of Lower Dundalk, Co. Louth
 Plaster, Ballymascanlan Civil Parish, Barony of Lower Dundalk, Co. Louth
 Proleek, Ballymascanlan Civil Parish, Barony of Lower Dundalk, Co. Louth
 Proleek Acres, Ballymascanlan Civil Parish, Barony of Lower Dundalk, Co. Louth
 Rampark, Ballymascanlan Civil Parish, Barony of Lower Dundalk, Co. Louth
 Rath, Carlingford Civil Parish, Barony of Lower Dundalk, Co. Louth
 Rathcor, Carlingford Civil Parish, Barony of Lower Dundalk, Co. Louth
 Rath Lower, Carlingford Civil Parish, Barony of Lower Dundalk, Co. Louth
 Ravensdale Park, Jonesborough Civil Parish, Barony of Lower Dundalk, Co. Louth
 Rockmarshall, Ballymascanlan Civil Parish, Barony of Lower Dundalk, Co. Louth
 Seecrin, Carlingford Civil Parish, Barony of Lower Dundalk, Co. Louth
 Slievenaglogh, Ballymascanlan Civil Parish, Barony of Lower Dundalk, Co. Louth
 Spellickanee, Ballymascanlan Civil Parish, Barony of Lower Dundalk, Co. Louth
 Templetown, Carlingford Civil Parish, Barony of Lower Dundalk, Co. Louth
 Tullaghomeath, Carlingford Civil Parish, Barony of Lower Dundalk, Co. Louth
 Upper Faughart, Ballymascanlan Civil Parish, Barony of Lower Dundalk, Co. Louth)
 Whitemill, Ballymascanlan Civil Parish, Barony of Lower Dundalk, Co. Louth
 Whitestown, Carlingford Civil Parish, Barony of Lower Dundalk, Co. Louth
 Willville, Carlingford Civil Parish, Barony of Lower Dundalk, Co. Louth

References

Baronies of County Louth